John Jones (28 March 1895 – 1962) was a Welsh footballer who played as a goalkeeper. He played in four Football League matches for Liverpool in the 1924–25 season.

External links
 LFC History profile

1895 births
Welsh footballers
Liverpool F.C. players
Date of death missing
People from Holyhead
1962 deaths
Association football goalkeepers
English Football League players
Sportspeople from Anglesey